Tacata' (alternative writings Tacatà and Tacatá) is an international hit by Italian group Tacabro with Cuban artist Martínez Rodríguez as main vocalist for the release on 541 / N.E.W.S. labels in Italy, France and Sweden and with Sony Music in Denmark. The music is composed by the Italian duo Mario Romano and Salvatore Sapienza known as Romano & Sapienza and lyrics by Raul-Rodriguez Martinez.

"Tacata'" was originally a hit in Italy and was credited to Romano & Sapienza featuring Rodríguez reaching number 4 on the Italian Singles Charts. The same name was used for the initial Swiss release. Releases on other European charts were credited to the formation Tacabro and charted as such in France, Denmark and Sweden. The song has gained recognition in North America, reaching number 83 in Canada where it was the most popular outside Europe.

Releases

Singles
Tacata' (by Tacabro)
Tacata' (4:49)

Tacata' (by Tacabro feat. Rodriguez)
Tacata' (Radio edit) (3:30)
Tacata' (Extended mix) (4:44)

EPs
Tacata' Remixes
Tacata' (Radio Edit) (3:30)
Tacata' (Extended) (4:44)
Tacata' (Stylus Josh, Eros Remix) (5:34)
Tacata' (Marco Branky Radio Remix) (3:34)
Tacata' (Marco Branky Remix) (5:02)
Tacata' (Karmin Shiff Remix) (6:09)
Tacata' (DJ Willy Remix) (5:31)
Tacata' (Dany Lorence Remix) (4:50)
Tacata' (El Berna Jam) (3:31)
Tacata' Video (3:46)
Tacata' (Whoami Remix By Victote and Usra) (3:19)
Tacata' (TOMER G & Gilad M Stadium Remake) (3:38)
Tacata' (TOMER G & Marko Stadium Remix Extended) (5:30)

Appearances
"Tacatà" Radio edit version credited to Tacabro featuring Rodriguez appears as title track in the compilation albums Tacatà Compilation and Latino - Greatest Hits 2012 Vol. 2.

Music video
Two separate music videos were released for "Tacata'" produced by Danceandlove, the first in January 2012 and the second in February 2012. The videos are directed by Alex Bufalo and DOP by Francesco Fracchionio. The music videos show Martínez Rodríguez singing and dancing in front of a banner reading Tacabro or through visual effects in the background. With Rodríguez dancing the Tacata', there is vocal as well as music accompaniment and mixing by Mario Romano and Salvatore Sapienza. In other scenes of the music video, Martínez Rodríguez is joined in by other girls dancing the Tacata' with him.

Charts
Originally released in Italy on 5 January 2012, it became a hit in Italy, and in many dance venues all over Europe. The song reached #4 on the Italian Singles Chart and #1 on the Danish Singles Chart for three consecutive weeks in April and May 2012.

In France for the initial three weeks, two versions were in the French SNEP charts. On 21 April 2012, the two versions appeared at #98 and #134 simultaneously in first week of release. On chart dated 28 April they both appeared at #50 and #65 and for chart dated 5 May 2012 at #33 and #42 simultaneously. But SNEP coupled both listing into one for chart dated 12 May 2012, with the single rising to #6 in the French chart.

Peak positions
Romano & Sapienza feat. Rodriguez version

Tacabro version

Year-end charts

Certifications

Other versions
DJ Adam released his own remixed version entitled "Tacata" on 23 April 2012 on Beat Factory label that appeared at #187 in the French Singles Top 200 and rising to #133 during May 2012.

Mr. Takata released a cover version as "Tacatà". This version charted in the French Singles Top 200 for one week reaching number 114. It also charted in Austrian Singles Chart for two weeks reaching number 57.

Japanese pop group MAX sampled the song under the same title for their comeback in 2013.

References

External links
Tacabro Official website
Original label's website
MusicJam.if: Tacata' Lyrics

2012 singles
Number-one singles in Austria
Number-one singles in Denmark
SNEP Top Singles number-one singles
Number-one singles in Israel
Number-one singles in Switzerland
2011 songs